A Road to Mecca – The Journey of Muhammad Asad, also known as A Road to Mecca, is a 2008 documentary by Austrian filmmaker Georg Misch. The documentary traces the path of Muslim scholar and political theorist Muhammad Asad, which led to his conversion to Islam.

Synopsis 
In the early 1920s Leopold Weiss, a Jew born in Lemberg, traveled to the Middle East. The desert fascinated him, and Islam became his new spiritual home. He left his Jewish roots behind, converted to Islam and changed his name to Muhammad Asad. He became one of the most important Muslims of the 20th century, first as an adviser at the royal court of Saudi Arabia, and later translating the Quran into English. Asad also played an important role in the creation of Pakistan and served as its envoy to the United Nations. The director follows his fading footsteps, leading from the Arabian desert to Ground Zero. He finds a man who was not looking for adventures but rather wanted to act as a mediator between East and West. “A Road To Mecca” takes this opportunity to deal with a heated debate which is currently becoming more and more important.

Reception 
The documentary received positive reviews from many magazines and newspapers e.g. Dox Magazine, Kleine Zeitung and Der Standard. Alissa Simon of Variety wrote:
"Informative... a well-judged combo of travelogue and biopic... a fine piece of anthropology, worthy of the dedication it copies from Asad's translation of the Koran: 'For people who think.'"

Awards 
The documentary was selected by the following film festivals, picking up a few awards:

 2009 – Jerusalem Film Festival
 2009 – Dubai Film Festival
 2008 – FIDADOC Film Festival, Morocco (Jury Award)
 2008 – Diagonale Festival of Austrian Films (Best Cinematography Award)
 2008 – Hot Docs Canadian International Documentary Festival
 2008 – Vancouver International Film Festival

See also
 List of Islamic films

References

External links 
 
 Aljazeera Feature
 Icarus Films
 Mischief Films presskit 

Documentary films about Islam
Austrian documentary films
Muhammad Asad
2008 films
2008 in Austria
2008 in Islam
2008 documentary films
2000s English-language films